Events in the year 1950 in Brazil.

Incumbents

Federal government
 President: Marshal Eurico Gaspar Dutra 
 Vice President: Nereu Ramos

Governors 
 Alagoas: Silvestre Pericles
 Amazonas: Leopoldo da Silva Amorim Neves
 Bahia: Otávio Mangabeira 
 Ceará: Faustino de Albuquerque 
 Espírito Santo: Carlos Fernando Monteiro Lindenberg 
 Goiás: Jerônimo Coimbra Bueno (till 30 June); Hosanah Guimarães (from 30 June)
 Maranhão: 
 Mato Grosso: Arnaldo Estêvão de Figueiredo then Jari Gomes
 Minas Gerais: Milton Soares Campos 
 Pará: Luís de Moura Carvalho (till 30 June); Alberto Engelhard (from 30 June)
 Paraíba: Osvaldo Trigueiro 
 Paraná: Moisés Lupion 
 Pernambuco: Alexandre Barbosa Lima Sobrinho 
 Piauí: José da Rocha Furtado 
 Rio de Janeiro: Macedo Soares 
 Rio Grande do Norte: José Augusto Varela 
 Rio Grande do Sul: Walter Só Jobim 
 Santa Catarina: Aderbal Ramos da Silva 
 São Paulo: Ademar de Barros 
 Sergipe: Jose Rollemberg

Vice governors
 Ceará: Francisco de Menezes Pimentel 
 Espírito Santo: José Rodrigues Sette 
 Goiás: Hosanah de Campos Guimarães (till 30 June); vacant thereafter (from 30 June)
 Maranhão: Saturnino Bello
 Minas Gerais: José Ribeiro Pena 
 Paraíba: José Targino Pereira da Costa 
 Piauí: Osvaldo da Costa e Silva 
 Rio Grande do Norte: Tomaz Salustino
 São Paulo: Luís Gonzaga Novelli Júnior

Events
24 June - The 1950 World Cup starts.
16 July- The World Cup ends, with the 2-1 defeat of Brazil national team by Uruguay on Maracanã.
18 September- First television broadcasting in Brazil by TV Tupi.
3 October - The Brazilian general election is won by the Social Democratic Party, who remain the largest party in both the Chamber of Deputies and the Senate, although they lose their majority in the former. The presidential election is won by former President Getúlio Vargas of the Brazilian Labour Party.
date unknown - After being grounded because of a shortage of equipment, the airline Transportes Aéreos Bandeirantes is sold to Lóide Aéreo Nacional.

Arts and culture

Books
Ulrich Becher - Brasilianischer Romanzero (published in Vienna)

Films
Alameda da Saudade 113, directed by Carlos Ortiz. 
Caiçara, co-directed by Adolfo Celi, Tom Payne, and John Waterhouse, starring Celi and José Mauro de Vasconcelos.
Caraça, Porta do Céu, directed by Theodor Luts, starring José Álvaro Morais.
Quando a Noite Acaba, starring Tônia Carrero.

Births
2 January – Débora Duarte, actress
20 January – Daniel Benzali, actor
12 February – João W. Nery, writer and LGBT activist (died 2018)
15 March – Cláudio Duarte, footballer and coach
7 April – Marisa Letícia Lula da Silva, former First Lady of Brazil (died 2017)
2 May – Fausto Silva, television presenter

Deaths
8 May – Vital Brazil, physician and immunologist (born 1865)
2 October – J. Carlos, illustrator and designer (born 1884)

References

See also 
1950 in Brazilian football
List of Brazilian films of 1950

 
1950s in Brazil
Years of the 20th century in Brazil
Brazil
1950 in South America